The Ryukyu flycatcher (Ficedula owstoni) is a passerine bird in the Old World flycatcher family.  It is native to Okinawa and Ryukyu in Japan.

References

Ryukyu flycatcher
Birds of the Ryukyu Islands
Endemic birds of Japan
Ryukyu flycatcher
Ryukyu flycatcher